Kevin Stephan (born 23 July 1990 in Berlin) is a German footballer who plays for Eintracht Mahlsdorf.

External links 
 
 

1990 births
Living people
Footballers from Berlin
German footballers
Association football forwards
2. Bundesliga players
Füchse Berlin Reinickendorf players
Tennis Borussia Berlin players
Hertha BSC II players
FC Erzgebirge Aue players
VSG Altglienicke players